Ladies Beware is a 1927 American silent crime film directed by Charles Giblyn and starring George O'Hara, Nola Luxford and Kathleen Myers.

Synopsis
Jack, a jewel thief, is advised to leave town by the police. Before he does so he heads to the house party hosted by Georgette Ring, knowing that she has a very valuable ruby. His former associate Jeannie, now working as secretary to Mrs. Ring attempts to prevent him from taking it. In the event it is stolen by another of the guests Count Bodevsky.

Cast
 George O'Hara as Jack O'Diamonds
 Nola Luxford as Jeannie
 Florence Wix as Mrs. Ring
 Kathleen Myers as Georgette
 Mario Carillo as Count Bodevsky
 Alan Brooks as Renwick Clarke
 Byron Douglas as Deputy Commissioner Croswell
 Bud Jamison as Tubbs
 Jimmy Aubrey as Handy

References

Bibliography
 Connelly, Robert B. The Silents: Silent Feature Films, 1910-36, Volume 40, Issue 2. December Press, 1998.
 Munden, Kenneth White. The American Film Institute Catalog of Motion Pictures Produced in the United States, Part 1. University of California Press, 1997.

External links
 

1927 films
1927 crime films
American silent feature films
American crime films
American black-and-white films
Films directed by Charles Giblyn
Film Booking Offices of America films
1920s English-language films
1920s American films
English-language crime films